Erling Linde Larsen (9 November 1931 – 15 December 2017) was a Danish footballer who played as a right-back. He made 20 appearances for the Denmark national team from 1956 to 1959. He was also part of Denmark's squad at the 1960 Summer Olympics, but he did not play in any matches.

References

External links
 

1931 births
2017 deaths
Footballers from Odense
Danish men's footballers
Association football fullbacks
Denmark international footballers
Olympic footballers of Denmark
Footballers at the 1960 Summer Olympics
Boldklubben 1909 players